Invisible Bankers: Everything the Insurance Industry Never Wanted You to Know is a 1982 book on the insurance industry. It was written by the financial journalist Andrew Tobias who became famous for his earlier book The Only Investment Guide You'll Ever Need. It covers the financial details of life, auto, health and fire insurance—the types consumers normally buy.

Because insurers are frequently the victims of insurance fraud, insurance companies need to be on their guard. In addition, an unscrupulous insurer could, in theory, make more profits if it could either induce their insureds into settling for less than they are entitled to or from outright wrongly denying valid claims in hopes that a small yet significant percentage would either get discouraged or wrongly believe that their claims were invalid. This makes dealings with insurers difficult. This book was the first guide to ordinary consumers into both the math and the business side of insurance.

See also
The Only Investment Guide You'll Ever Need
The Bankers by Martin Mayer

External links
 New York Times review

1982 non-fiction books
Business books
Finance books
Simon & Schuster books